Ray Hazley (born  1959) is a former Gaelic footballer who played for the Dublin county team.

He won an All-Ireland Senior Football Championship medal with Dublin in 1983, after being sent off in the final. He auctioned the medal in 2013.

He was PepsiCo president in Spain until 2010. He then became commercial vice president of the PepsiCo South Eastern Europe Region.

References

External links
 Article on the Summer of 83'

1950s births
Living people
Dual players
Dublin inter-county Gaelic footballers
Irish expatriates in Spain
Irish expatriate sportspeople in Turkey
PepsiCo people
Winners of one All-Ireland medal (Gaelic football)